Perfect on Paper, is a couple matching program produced by JTBC and Endemol Shine Group, a global production powerhouse that creates content for a worldwide audience. The show was aired every Friday at 21:00.

Format
It is a variety show that will attempt to match couples based on characteristics such as personal disposition, lifestyle, and values. This contrasts from most other Korean matchmaking programs which focus on qualifications such as occupation, education, wealth, and physical appearance. Scientific and systematic analysis by experts will be used to match people that appear perfect together on paper.

Main Host 

 Shin Dong-yup
 Kim Hee-chul

List of episodes and rating 
In the ratings below, the highest rating for the show will be in red, and the lowest rating for the show will be in blue.

Notes

References

External links
 
 

2017 South Korean television series debuts
Korean-language television shows
South Korean variety television shows
JTBC original programming
2018 South Korean television series endings